Ping'an District also known as Ping'anyi, is an administrative district and the seat of the city of Haidong, in the east of Qinghai province of the People's Republic of China, located about  east from Xining. Its postal code is 810600, and its population is 127,480, 29.4% of whom belong to Ethnic minorities. The area is known for its Selenium resources.

During the Han dynasty it was known as Anyi County, and as Zhongge during the Tang dynasty, then as Pingrong and Ping'an during the Ming and Qing dynasty respectively. In 2015, Ping'an County became Ping'an District.

Administrative divisions 
Ping'an District is divided into three towns and five townships.

Transportation
The Ping'anyi railway station was first built in 1959 and is operated by the China Railway Qingzang Group. The station is situated on the Lanzhou–Qinghai railway. The Haidong West railway station is situated on the Lanzhou–Xinjiang high-speed railway.

National Highway 109 also runs through the district.

See also
 List of administrative divisions of Qinghai
 Taktser, a village in Ping'an District

References

External links
https://web.archive.org/web/20130718064031/http://www.hdpa.gov.cn/ - People's Government Web site 
https://web.archive.org/web/20100127174358/http://www.qh.xinhuanet.com/pax/zfwq.htm - xinhuanet
http://www.xzqh.org/quhua/63qh/2121pa.htm - Qinghai Province - China - Administrative Division
http://www.pancsw.gov.cn/ - Ping'An County Rural Business Information Network

Ping'an County
Haidong